Febriyanto Wijaya (born February 20, 1990 in Makassar) is an Indonesian footballer who currently plays for Persela Lamongan in the Indonesia Super League. He is a descendant of Tionghoa.

Club statistics

References

External links

1990 births
Association football forwards
Living people
Indonesian people of Chinese descent
Indonesian footballers
Liga 1 (Indonesia) players
Persela Lamongan players
Sportspeople from Makassar
20th-century Indonesian people
21st-century Indonesian people